Kumdere is a village in the Tarsus district of Mersin Province, Turkey. At  it is situated in the southern slopes of the Toros Mountains and to the west It is situated to the west of Turkish state highway . Its population was 224  as of 2012.

References

Villages in Tarsus District